The 1999–2000 Danish Superliga season was the 10th season of the Danish Superliga league championship, governed by the Danish Football Association. It took place from the first match on July 24, 1999, to final match on May 28, 2000.

The Danish champions qualified for the third UEFA Champions League 2000-01 qualification round, the runner-up entered the Champions League in the second qualification round, while the third placed team qualified for the first qualification round of the UEFA Cup 2000-01. The fourth and fifth placed teams qualified for the UEFA Intertoto Cup 2000, while the two lowest placed teams of the tournament was directly relegated to the Danish 1st Division. Likewise, the Danish 1st Division champions and runners-up were promoted to the Superliga.

Table

Results

Top goalscorers

See also
 1999-2000 in Danish football

External links
  Fixtures at NetSuperligaen.dk
  Peders Fodboldstatistik

Danish Superliga seasons
1999–2000 in Danish football
Denmark